
Gmina Kozienice is an urban-rural gmina (administrative district) in Kozienice County, Masovian Voivodeship, in east-central Poland.

Villages
Apart from the town of Kozienice, Gmina Kozienice contains the villages and settlements of Aleksandrówka, Brzeźnica, Budy, Chinów, Cudów, Cztery Kopce, Dąbrówki, Holendry Kozienickie, Holendry Kuźmińskie, Janików, Janików-Folwark, Janów, Katarzynów, Kępa Bielańska, Kępa Wólczyńska, Kępeczki, Kociołki, Kuźmy, Łaszówka, Łuczynów, Majdany, Michałówka, Nowa Wieś, Nowiny, Opatkowice, Piotrkowice, Przewóz, Psary, Ruda, Samwodzie, Selwanówka, Śmietanki, Stanisławice, Staszów, Świerże Górne, Wilczkowice Górne, Wójtostwo, Wola Chodkowska, Wólka Tyrzyńska, Wólka Tyrzyńska B and Wymysłów.

Neighbouring gminas
Gmina Kozienice is bordered by the gminas of Garbatka-Letnisko, Głowaczów, Maciejowice, Magnuszew, Pionki, Sieciechów and Stężyca.

References
Polish official population figures 2006

Kozienice
Kozienice County